Gundlapally is a village in Nalgonda district of Telangana State, India.

References

Mandal headquarters in Nalgonda district